

Medalists

Final

4 × 400 metres relay at the World Athletics Indoor Championships
Relay women
2008 in women's athletics